Count Johan II of East Frisia (29 September 1538, Aurich – 29 September 1591, Stickhausen Castle) was a member of the House of Cirksena and from 1561 until his death in 1591 co-regent of the county of East Frisia.  He ruled jointly with his brother Edzard II.

In 1558 the primogeniture of John's mother, the Countess Anna was abolished, presumably to stem the impact of the house Vasa in the county, which was based on the marriage of her eldest son Edzard with Catherine Vasa of Sweden, the eldest daughter of King Gustav I of Sweden.  This meant that she abolished Edzard right to be the sole ruler of the county.  This led to a de facto division of East Frisia, because Johan, like his mother, was a Calvinist, whereas Edzard II was a Lutheran.

Life 
In 1559, his brother Edzard took Johan to his wedding in Stockholm, where Johan had an affair with Cecilia, the daughter of King Gustav I Vasa (and therefore his sister-in-law).  He was caught and was nearly sentenced to death if it hadn't been for the intercession of the Queen Elizabeth I.  Johan never married after that.

After the death of their brother Christoffel in 1566, the power struggle between Johan and Edzard worsened.  Johan blocked Edzard's exercise of sovereign power and strengthened the nobility and the citizens of Emden.   Ultimately, this struggle provided the foundation for the coexistence of faiths in East Frisia: since none of them could prevail over the other, the Lutheran Edzard failed to establish the Lutheran church as the only church allowed in the county.

After Johan died in 1591, Edzard finally became the sole ruler of the County of East Frisia, but his authority had been severely hit by the ongoing conflict.  This was a substantial factor, which eventually contributed to the so-called Emden Revolution.

References and Sources 
 Martin Tielke (ed.): Biographisches Lexikon für Ostfriesland. Ostfriesische Landschaft, Aurich 1993, .

Counts of East Frisia
1538 births
1591 deaths
People from Aurich